Santa Fe 2926 is a former Atchison, Topeka and Santa Fe Railway (ATSF) class 2900 4-8-4 type steam locomotive, built by Baldwin in 1944. It was used to pull passenger and fast freight trains, mostly throughout New Mexico, until its fire was dropped on Christmas Eve of 1953, and it was retired from revenue service. It was subsequently donated to a park in Albuquerque for static display. In 1999, it was purchased by the New Mexico Steam Locomotive and Railroad Historical Society to be rebuilt for operational purposes. After over twenty years of work, No. 2926 steamed up again on July 24, 2021, and will eventually be used in mainline excursion service between Albuquerque and Las Vegas, New Mexico.

History

Revenue service 
No. 2926 was among the last group of steam passenger locomotives built in 1944 by the Baldwin Locomotive Works in Eddystone (Philadelphia), Pennsylvania for the Santa Fe Railway. This class of locomotives comprised the heaviest 4-8-4's built in the United States, and among the largest. The railroad used the locomotive in both fast freight and passenger service, and it accumulated over one million miles of usage before its last revenue run on December 24, 1953. Equipped with the latest Timken roller-bearing tandem side-rods between 1946-1948, it was then approved for 110-mph speeds with the Santa Fe's crack passenger trains: up from 100-mph when delivered with its original side-rods.  The locomotive and a caboose were donated to the City of Albuquerque, New Mexico in July, 1956 in recognition of the city's 250th anniversary, and placed in Coronado Park.

Preservation 

The city displayed the locomotive as a static exhibit in the park until it was sold to the New Mexico Steam Locomotive and Railroad Historical Society (NMSL & RHS) on July 26, 1999. On June 23, 2000, the locomotive was moved by Messer Construction Company to a BNSF Railway rail siding just south of Menaul Boulevard. In May 2002 the locomotive was moved by the railroad to its current location near the intersection of 8th Street and Haines Avenue, where it is undergoing restoration to operating condition by the Society. When the restoration is completed, No. 2926 will be the largest operating 4-8-4 steam locomotive in the United States.

On February 11, 2016, House Memorial Bill 100, introduced by Don L. Tripp and adopted by the New Mexico Legislature, recognized the Santa Fe No. 2926 steam locomotive as "New Mexico's steam locomotive and a representative of the railroads' contributions to the economic and cultural growth and stature of New Mexico".

In January, 2018, it was reported that the restoration was nearing completion and that the locomotive could be operational by the end of the year. As of that date, NMSL&RHS members had put in 166,000 hours of volunteer labor and spent over $2.8 million on the project.

On August 20, 2018, the boiler of ATSF No. 2926 was fired up for the first time in 65 years. The locomotive was scheduled for a test run on March 20, 2020, when it would move under its own power for the first time since 1953. However, that event and most other restoration efforts were suspended due to the COVID-19 pandemic in New Mexico. On July 24, 2021 the No. 2926 locomotive moved under its own power for the first time in sixty-eight years.

The locomotive has been listed on the National Register of Historic Places since October 1, 2007.

References

Further reading

External links 
 New Mexico Steam Locomotive and Railroad Historical Society website
 National Register of Historic Places Weekly Update
 Facebook Page
 

2926
4-8-4 locomotives
Landmarks in Albuquerque, New Mexico
Baldwin locomotives
Individual locomotives of the United States
National Register of Historic Places in New Mexico
Railway locomotives on the National Register of Historic Places
Railway locomotives introduced in 1944
History of Bernalillo County, New Mexico
Tourist attractions in Albuquerque, New Mexico
New Mexico State Register of Cultural Properties
National Register of Historic Places in Albuquerque, New Mexico
Rail transportation on the National Register of Historic Places in New Mexico
Standard gauge locomotives of the United States
Preserved steam locomotives of New Mexico